The Sound of Paul Horn is an album by Paul Horn which was originally released on the Columbia label in 1961.

Reception

The Allmusic site awarded the album 4 stars stating: "This sadly out-of-print Columbia LP features Paul Horn at the peak of his jazz powers. ...a fine jazz improviser who fell between cool jazz and hard bop".

Track listing
All compositions by Paul Horn except as indicated
 "Benny's Buns" - 2:57
 "Without a Song"  (Vincent Youmans, Billy Rose, Edward Eliscu) - 3:37
 "Yazz Per Favore" (Emil Richards) - 4:30
 "Mirage For Miles" -	11:50
 "Short Politician" (Paul Moer) - 4:02
 "My Funny Valentine" (Richard Rodgers, Lorenz Hart) - 5:15
 "Blue on Blue" - 6:57
 "Moer or Less" (Moer) - 4:05

Personnel
Paul Horn - alto saxophone, flute, clarinet
Emil Richards - vibraphone
Paul Moer - piano
Jimmy Bond - bass
Milt Turner - drums

References

Paul Horn (musician) albums
1961 albums
Albums produced by Irving Townsend
Columbia Records albums